The historic Washington County Courthouse in Stillwater, Minnesota, United States, is one of the oldest standing courthouses in Minnesota.  It was the center of Washington County government for over a century, from the building's completion in 1870 until 1975.  It was listed on the National Register of Historic Places in 1971 for having state-level significance in the themes of architecture and government/politics.  It was nominated as Minnesota's oldest functioning courthouse and one of its few surviving examples of monumental public architecture from the mid-19th century.

History

The courthouse was designed by Augustus Knight of St. Paul, in the Italianate style.  When the courthouse opened in 1870, the county was doing a booming business in the lumber industry.  The courthouse reflected the county's wealth and overlooked the city from atop Zion's Hill.  The foundation is built of limestone, and the building has a brick facade and is topped with a prominent dome, cupola, and flagpole. It cost $60,000 to construct, .

When the county offices were moved to the new Washington County Government Center in 1975, efforts began to reuse the structure.  Restoration has been funded through donations from local businesses and community groups, as well as grants from foundations.  The historic courthouse is still in operation and serves as a gathering place and as a venue for community, cultural, and private events.  The mission statement states, "The purpose of the operation of the Washington County Historic Courthouse is to preserve, re-adapt, restore and interpret this historic landmark for current and future generations, especially those from Washington County."  To this end, the county works with local groups to preserve and maintain the courthouse and grounds, conducts tours and provides historic interpretation of the county's heritage.  The facility is also available for rental, which offsets some of the expenses of maintaining the structure.

See also
 List of county courthouses in Minnesota
 National Register of Historic Places listings in Washington County, Minnesota

References

External links

Washington County Historic Courthouse

County courthouses in Minnesota
Courthouses on the National Register of Historic Places in Minnesota
Former courthouses in Minnesota
Government buildings completed in 1870
History museums in Minnesota
Italianate architecture in Minnesota
Museums in Washington County, Minnesota
Stillwater, Minnesota
National Register of Historic Places in Washington County, Minnesota